The term Paradies (German for paradise) may refer to

Paradise (2011 film), a 2011 Greek romance film directed by Panagiotis Fafoutis
Paradise trilogy, a film trilogy by Ulrich Seidl with the original title Paradies
Paradies (album), an album by Silly
Paradies (Constance), a district of Constance
"Paradies" (song), a song by Die Toten Hosen
Paradies, a film by Želimir Žilnik
Paradies Castle, a castle in the Ústí nad Labem Region
Paradies Glacier (German: Paradiesgletscher), a glacier situated in the Lepontine Alps in Switzerland
Paradies Lagardère or The Paradies Shops, a chain of airport specialty stores

People with the surname
Ewa Paradies (1920–1946), Nazi concentration camp overseer executed for war crimes
Pietro Domenico Paradies, Italian Baroque composer and keyboardist
Yin Paradies, Australian public health researcher